Xhosa, formerly spelled Xosa and also known by its local name isiXhosa, is a Nguni language and one of the official languages of South Africa and Zimbabwe. Xhosa is spoken as a first language by approximately 8.2 million people and as a second language by another 11 million, mostly in South Africa, particularly in Eastern Cape, Western Cape, Northern Cape and Gauteng, and also in parts of Zimbabwe and Lesotho. It has perhaps the heaviest functional load of click consonants in a Bantu language (approximately tied with Yeyi), with one count finding that 10% of basic vocabulary items contained a click.

Classification
Xhosa is part of the branch of Nguni languages, which also include Zulu, Southern Ndebele and Northern Ndebele, called the Zunda languages. Zunda languages effectively form a dialect continuum of variously mutually intelligible varieties.

Xhosa is, to a large extent, mutually intelligible with Zulu and with other Nguni languages to a lesser extent. Nguni languages are, in turn, classified under the much larger abstraction of Bantu languages.

Geographical distribution

Xhosa is the most widely distributed African language in South Africa, though the most widely spoken African language is Zulu. It is the second most common Bantu home language in South Africa as a whole.  approximately 5.3 million Xhosa-speakers, the majority, live in the Eastern Cape, followed by the Western Cape (approximately 2 million), Gauteng (671,045), the Free State (246,192), KwaZulu-Natal (219,826), North West (214,461), Mpumalanga (46,553), the Northern Cape (51,228), and Limpopo (14,225). There is a small but significant Xhosa community of about 200,000 in Zimbabwe. Also, a small community of Xhosa speakers (18,000) live in Quthing District, Lesotho.

Orthography

Latin script
The Xhosa language employs 26 letters from the Latin alphabet. However, some of the letters have a different pronunciation from English. Additional phonemes use sequences of multiple letters. Tone, stress and vowel length are not indicated.

Phonology

Vowels
The /i/ vowel is long in the penultimate syllable and short in the last syllable.

Tones
Xhosa is a tonal language with two inherent phonemic tones: low and high. Long vowels are phonemic but are usually not written except for â and ä, which are each sequences of two vowels with different tones that are realized as long vowels with contour tones (â high–low = falling, ä low–high = rising).

Consonants
Xhosa is rich in uncommon consonants. Besides pulmonic egressive sounds, which are found in all spoken languages, it has a series of ejective stops and one implosive stop. 

It has 18 click consonants (in comparison, Juǀ'hoan, spoken in Botswana and Namibia, has 48, and Taa, with roughly 4,000 speakers in Botswana, has 83). There is a series of six dental clicks, represented by the letter ⟨c⟩, similar to the sound represented in English by "tut-tut" or "tsk-tsk"; a series of six alveolar lateral clicks, represented by the letter ⟨x⟩, similar to the sound used to call horses; and a series of alveolar clicks, represented by the letter ⟨q⟩, that sound somewhat like a cork pulled from a bottle.

The following table lists the consonant phonemes of the language, with the pronunciation in IPA on the left and the orthography on the right:

Both are spelled r.
Both are spelled zh.
Both are spelled dz, as the sound [d̥zʱ].
An additional consonant,  is found in loans. It is spelled ngh.
The onset cluster /kl/ from phonologized loanwords such as ikliniki "the clinic" can be realized as a single consonant [kʟ̥ʼ].
The unwritten glottal stop is present in words like uku(ʔ)ayinela "to iron", uku(ʔ)a(ʔ)aza "to stutter", uku(ʔ)amza "to stall".
In informal writing, this murmured consonant can sometimes be seen spelled as vh as in ukuvha, but this is non-standard.
Sequences of /jw/ as in ukushiywa "abandomnent" are phonologically realized [ɥ], but this sound is non-phonemic.

The breathy voiced glottal fricative  is sometimes spelled h.

The ejectives tend to be ejective only in careful pronunciation or in salient positions and, even then, only for some speakers. Otherwise, they tend to be tenuis (plain) stops. Similarly, the tenuis (plain) clicks are often glottalised, with a long voice onset time, but that is uncommon.

The murmured clicks, plosives and affricates are only partially voiced, with the following vowel murmured for some speakers. That is, da may be pronounced  (or, equivalently). They are better described as slack voiced than as breathy voiced. They are truly voiced only after nasals, but the oral occlusion is then very short in stops, and it usually does not occur at all in clicks. Therefore, the absolute duration of voicing is the same as in tenuis stops. (They may also be voiced between vowels in some speaking styles.) The more notable characteristic is their depressor effect on the tone of the syllable.

Consonant changes with prenasalisation

When consonants are prenasalised, their pronunciation and spelling may change. The murmur no longer shifts to the following vowel. Fricatives become affricated and, if voiceless, they become ejectives as well: mf is pronounced , ndl is pronounced , n+hl becomes ntl , n+z becomes ndz , n+q becomes [n͡ŋǃʼ] etc. The orthographic b in mb is the voiced plosive . Prenasalisation occurs in several contexts, including on roots with the class 9 prefix /iN-/, for example on an adjective which is feature-matching its noun:

/iN- + ɬɛ/ → [intɬɛ] "beautiful" (of a class 9 word like inja "dog")

When aspirated clicks (ch, xh, qh) are prenasalised, the silent letter k is added (nkc, nkx, nkq) to prevent confusion with the nasal clicks nc, nx, nq, and are actually distinct sounds. The prenasalized versions have a very short voicing at the onset which then releases in an ejective, like the prenasalized affricates, while the phonemically nasal clicks have a very long voicing through the consonant. When plain voiceless clicks (c, x, q) are prenasalized, they become slack voiced nasal (ngc, ngx, ngq).

Consonant changes with palatalisation

While palatalisation occurred historically, it is still productive, as is shown by palatalization before the passive suffix /-w/ and before diminutive suffix /-ana/. This process can skip rightwards to non-local syllables (i.e. uku-sebenz-is-el + wa -> ukusetyenziselwa "be used for"), but does not affect morpheme-initial consonants (i.e. uku-bhal+wa -> ukubhalwa "to be written", instead of illicit *ukujalwa). The palatalization process only applies once, as evidenced by ukuphuphumisa+wa -> ukuphuphunyiswa "to be made to overflow", instead of the illicit alternative, *ukuphutshunyiswa.

Morphology
In keeping with many other Bantu languages, Xhosa is an agglutinative language, with an array of prefixes and suffixes that are attached to root words. As in other Bantu languages, nouns in Xhosa are classified into morphological classes, or genders (15 in Xhosa), with different prefixes for both singular and plural. Various parts of speech that qualify a noun must agree with the noun according to its gender. Agreements usually reflect part of the original class with which the word agrees. The word order is subject–verb–object, like in English.

The verb is modified by affixes to mark subject, object, tense, aspect and mood. The various parts of the sentence must agree in both class and number.

Nouns

The Xhosa noun consists of two essential parts, the prefix and the stem. Using the prefixes, nouns can be grouped into noun classes, which are numbered consecutively, to ease comparison with other Bantu languages.

The following table gives an overview of Xhosa noun classes, arranged according to singular-plural pairs.

1 Before monosyllabic stems, e.g.  (eye),  (list).

2 is- and iz- replace isi- and izi- respectively before stems beginning with a vowel, e.g. / (hand/hands).

3 The placeholder N in the prefixes iN- and iiN- is a nasal consonant which assimilates in place to the following consonant (producing an im- before vowels), but is typically absent in loanwords.

4 Before monosyllabic stems in some words.

Verbs

Verbs use the following prefixes for the subject and object:

Examples
 ukudlala – to play
 ukubona – to see
 umntwana – a child
 abantwana – children

 umntwana uyadlala – the child is playing
 abantwana bayadlala – the children are playing

 indoda – a man
 amadoda – men

 indoda iyambona umntwana – the man sees the child
 amadoda ayababona abantwana – the men see the children

Sample phrases and text 
The following is a list of phrases that can be used when one visits a region whose primary language is Xhosa:

History

Xhosa-speaking people have inhabited coastal regions of southeastern Africa since before the 16th century. They refer to themselves as the amaXhosa and their language as isiXhosa. Ancestors of the Xhosa migrated to the east coast of Africa and came across Khoisan-speaking people; "as a result of this contact, the Xhosa people borrowed some Khoisan words along with their pronunciation, for instance, the click sounds of the Khoisan languages". The Bantu ancestor of Xhosa did not have clicks, which attests to a strong historical contact with a Khoisan language that did. An estimated 15% of Xhosa vocabulary is of Khoisan origin. 

John Bennie was a Scottish Presbyterian missionary and early Xhosa linguist. Bennie, along with John Ross (another missionary), set up a printing press in the Tyhume Valley and the first printed works in Xhosa came out in 1823 from the Lovedale Press in the Alice region of the Eastern Cape. But, as with any language, Xhosa had a rich history of oral traditions from which the society taught, informed, and entertained one another. The first Bible translation was in 1859, produced in part by Henry Hare Dugmore.

Role in modern society

The role of indigenous languages in South Africa is complex and ambiguous. Their use in education has been governed by legislation, beginning with the Bantu Education Act, 1953.

At present, Xhosa is used as the main language of instruction in many primary schools and some secondary schools, but is largely replaced by English after the early primary grades, even in schools mainly serving Xhosa-speaking communities. The language is also studied as a subject.

The language of instruction at universities in South Africa is English or Afrikaans (to a diminishing extent), and Xhosa is taught as a subject, both for native and for non-native speakers.

Literary works, including prose and poetry, are available in Xhosa, as are newspapers and magazines. The South African Broadcasting Corporation broadcasts in Xhosa on both radio (on Umhlobo Wenene FM) and television, and films, plays and music are also produced in the language. The best-known performer of Xhosa songs outside South Africa was Miriam Makeba, whose Click Song #1 (Xhosa Qongqothwane) and "Click Song #2" (Baxabene Ooxam) are known for their large number of click sounds.

, the literacy rate for first-language Xhosa speakers was estimated at 50%.

Anthem

Nkosi Sikelel' iAfrika is part of the national anthem of South Africa, national anthem of Tanzania and Zambia, and the former anthem of Zimbabwe and Namibia. It is a Methodist hymn written in Xhosa by Enoch Sontonga in 1897. The original stanza was:

 Nkosi, sikelel' iAfrika;
 Maluphakamis' uphondo lwayo;
 Yiva imithandazo yethu
 Nkosi sikelela, thina lusapho lwayo.

 Lord, bless Africa;
 May her horn rise high up;
 Hear Thou our prayers
 Lord, bless us, its family (the family of Africa).

Additional stanzas were written later by Sontonga and other writers, with the original verse translated into Sotho and Afrikaans, as well as English.

In popular culture
Rafiki, the sagely mandrill chants Xhosa on The Lion King and its reboot.
 
In the Marvel Cinematic Universe films Captain America: Civil War, Black Panther, Avengers: Infinity War, Avengers: Endgame, and Black Panther: Wakanda Forever, the language spoken in the fictional African nation of Wakanda is Xhosa. This came about because South African actor John Kani, a native of the Eastern Cape province who plays Wakandan King T'Chaka, speaks Xhosa and suggested that the directors of the fictional Civil War incorporate a dialogue in the language. For Black Panther, director Ryan Coogler "wanted to make it a priority to use Xhosa as much as possible" in the script, and provided dialect coaches for the film's actors.

See also

 I'solezwe lesiXhosa, the first Xhosa-language newspaper
 U-Carmen eKhayelitsha, a 2005 Xhosa film adaptation of Bizet's Carmen
 UCLA Language Materials Project, an online project for teaching languages, including Xhosa.
 Xhosa calendar

Notes

References

External links

 Xhosa language profile (at UCLA Language Materials Project)
 PanAfrican L10n page on Xhosa
 Learn Xhosa
 Xhosa basic lexicon at the Global Lexicostatistical Database
 Paradisec has a collections of Arthur Capell's materials (AC1), which include Xhosa language materials

 
Language
Nguni languages
Subject–verb–object languages
Languages of South Africa
Click languages